State Highway 65 (SH 65) is a state highway in Colorado that crosses the Grand Mesa. The highway along with a road to Lands End Overlook were designated as the Grand Mesa National Scenic Byway in 1996. SH 65's southern terminus is at SH 92 east of Delta, and its northern terminus is at Interstate 70 (I-70) and U.S. Route 6 (US 6) northeast of Palisade.

Route description

SH 65 runs , starting at a junction with SH 92 east of Delta. The highway heads north, crossing the Gunnison River, through Orchard City and Cedaredge. The highway then enters Grand Mesa National Forest climbing to the top of Grand Mesa. It then drops down the north side of Grand Mesa, ending at a junction with I-70 northeast of Palisade.

Grand Mesa Scenic and Historic Byway
The byway runs north from Cedaredge along Highway 65, to the top of the Grand Mesa at more than 10,000 feet (3,000 m). It also includes Land's End Road to the Land's End Observatory from Highway 65. The byway continues past Island Lake, one of more than 300 trout-filled lakes in Grand Mesa National Forest. On the north side of the Mesa are the towns of Mesa, Collbran, and Powderhorn Ski Resort. The byway continues along De Beque Canyon, with its colorful sandstone bluffs, and eventually meets Interstate 70 in the town of De Beque.

Historic and scenic byway designations:
 National Scenic Byway received in 1996.
 Colorado Scenic and Historic Byway by the Colorado Department of Transportation received in 1991.
 Forest Service Byway received in 1992.

Scenic Overlooks include:
 Cedaredge overlook - an easy access overlook
 Land O Lakes overlook - a 1/4 mile moderate walk by foot
 Island Lake - an easy access overlook with restrooms and accessible boat ramp
 Grand Mesa Visitor Center - easy to moderate access with restrooms
 Mesa Lakes Lodge area - an easy to moderate access with restrooms
 Jumbo Lakes area - an easy access overlook with restrooms
 Skyway Point - an easy access
 Powderhorn - an easy access overlook with restrooms
 I-70 pullout and interpretation information

Major intersections

Gallery

See also
 Grand Mesa National Forest

References

External links

 Grand Mesa Scenic and Historic Byway

065
Transportation in Mesa County, Colorado
Transportation in Delta County, Colorado
Grand Mesa National Forest